Marco Ricchiedeo was an Italian painter born at Brescia, and active in the 16th century. He painted an Incredulity of Saint Thomas for the church of St Thomas in Brescia.

References

16th-century Italian painters
Italian male painters
Painters from Brescia
Year of death unknown
Year of birth unknown